The First Hundred Years is a 1938 American comedy-drama film directed by Richard Thorpe. The film stars Robert Montgomery, Virginia Bruce, and Warren William.

Cast
Robert Montgomery as David Conway
Virginia Bruce as Lynn Conway
Warren William as Harry Borden
Binnie Barnes as Claudia Weston
Alan Dinehart as Samuel Z. Walker
Harry Davenport as Uncle Dawson
Nydia Westman as Midge
Donald Briggs as William Regan
Jonathan Hale as Judge Parker
E. E. Clive as Chester Blascomb
Lee Bowman as George Wallace
Torben Meyer as Karl
Bodil Rosing as Martha
Irving Bacon as Wilkins
Barbara Bedford as Sadie (uncredited)

References

External links

 
 

1938 films
1938 comedy-drama films
American comedy-drama films
American black-and-white films
1930s English-language films
Metro-Goldwyn-Mayer films
Films directed by Richard Thorpe
1930s American films